Waterloo Road may refer to:

Transportation-related
 Waterloo Road, London, England
 Waterloo Road, Hong Kong, an east-west thoroughfare of Kowloon
 Waterloo Road (NSR) railway station, a former railway station of the North Staffordshire Railway
 Waterloo Road, the original name of Blackpool South railway station

Arts and entertainment
 Waterloo Road (film), 1945 British drama starring John Mills
 Waterloo Road (TV series), BBC One drama series about a school and its teachers and students
 "Waterloo Road", 1968 British song by rock band Jason Crest, later recorded & adapted into French as a 1969 single by Joe Dassin entitled "Les Champs-Élysées"

See also
Waterloo Street, Singapore